Angele Aline is a ship launched in Fécamp, France on 3 November 1921. She is one of the 700 little ships of Dunkirk which took part in Operation Dynamo in 1940. In 2010 she took part in the 70th anniversary return to Dunkirk.

References

1921 ships